Fem Belling (born 6 December 1978) is an South African Born, Australian Jazz vocalist and violinist with a dual career in stage musicals and jazz singing. Fem was raised in Johannesburg and later moved to Cape Town to establish a career in musical theatre before moving to London as a leading lady in the West End. Lead roles include Hairspray, Fame, Footloose, Cats (original South African cast) & Liza Minnelli in the 2011 production of The Boy from Oz starring Todd McKenney.

Fem claims 5 Vita awards, a Green Room Award nomination for Best Leading Actress in the Musical Genesis to Broadway” and shares an ARIA nomination from her involvement in The Public Opinion Afro Orchestra.

Theatre career
Cats as Jennyanydots / Bombalina, Footloose as Rusty / Elanor, Austentatious as Emily, Hairspray as Shelly / Tracey Turnblad ( Original West End cast ), Fame, Debbie Does Dallas as Donna ( original UK and South African cast ), Annie Get Your Gun as Gigi / Dolly ( National UK tour ), Joseph And The Amazing Technecolour Dreamcoat as the Narrator, Jesus Christ Superstar as Soul Girl, Little Shop of Horrors as Audrey, Nunsense Jamboree as Sister Mary Leo, Oklahoma as Ensemble, Summer Holiday as Alma / Barbera, Rocky Horror Show 25th Jubilee Tour as Phantom / Columbia / Janet, 2011 The Boy From Oz as Liza Minnelli, 2013 Genesis To Broadway as Fem Belling, 2013 Dear Blossom as Blossom Dearie, 2015 Sexercise the musical as Rhonda

Television career
Dora (Fem Belling) is a henchwoman/helicopter pilot in the 2001 comedy film Mr. Bones.

Music career
In 2007 Fem moved to Melbourne Australia to be with family and pursue her passion for jazz. In 2014 she auditioned for The Voice (Australia season 4) and reached the Super Battle round.

Discography

Studio albums

Awards and nominations

Australian Women in Music Awards
The Australian Women in Music Awards is an annual event that celebrates outstanding women in the Australian Music Industry who have made significant and lasting contributions in their chosen field. They commenced in 2018.

|-
| 2018
| Fem Billing
| Musical Excellence Award
|

References

External links
 Official web site

1978 births
Living people
Australian violinists
21st-century violinists